This is a list of notable individuals buried at Arlington National Cemetery in Arlington County, Virginia.

Military

Medal of Honor recipients
As of May 2006, there were 367 Medal of Honor recipients buried in Arlington National Cemetery, nine of whom are Canadians.

A
 George Emerson Albee (1845–1918), US Army officer; received for actions during the Indian Wars
 Beauford T. Anderson (1922–1996), US Army soldier during World War II

B
 Absalom Baird (1824–1905), US Army Brevet Major General, commanded a Division in the Army of the Cumberland; received for his actions at Battle of Jonesborough
 William E. Barber (1919–2002), US Marine Corps Colonel; received for his actions in the Battle of Chosin Reservoir during the Korean War
 John Basilone (1916–1945), US Marine Corps Gunnery Sergeant, killed at Iwo Jima; portrayed in the HBO mini-series The Pacific
 Randolph C. Berkeley (1875–1960), US Marine Corps Major General; received for his actions during the United States occupation of Veracruz
 Gregory "Pappy" Boyington (1912–1988), World War II US Marine Corps fighter ace and commander of VMF-214, the "Black Sheep Squadron" (basis for the 1970s TV series Baa Baa Black Sheep)
 John D. Bulkeley (1911–1996), US Navy Admiral, received for his actions in the Pacific Theater during WWII.

C
 James Alexander Campbell (1844–1904), US Army Private, Company A, 2nd New York Cavalry. Received while his command was retreating before superior numbers at Woodstock, Virginia, he voluntarily rushed back with one companion and rescued his commanding officer, who had been unhorsed and left behind. At Amelia courthouse he captured two battle flags. Civil War
 Albertus W. Catlin (1868–1933), US Marine Corps Brigadier General; received for his actions during the intervention at Veracruz, Mexico
 Jon R. Cavaiani (1943–2014), US Army Command Sergeant Major. Received for his actions while serving as platoon leader providing security for an isolated radio relay site located within enemy-held territory that came under attack. Prisoner of war during the Vietnam War (1971–1973)
 Justice M. Chambers (1908–1982), US Marine Corps officer; received for his actions in during the Battle of Iwo Jima
 Donald Cook (1934–1967) cenotaph, US Marine Corps officer. Received for his actions while a prisoner of war during the Vietnam War. His body was never recovered.
 Edwin Hyland Cooper (1881-1948), U.S. Signal Corps photographic officer in World War I, awarded two medals for bravery while covering the attack of the 26th Division, A.E.F, at Chateau-Thierry in July 1918 
 Louis Cukela (1888–1956), US Marine Corps Major, awarded two Medals of Honor for same act in World War I

D
 William Joseph "Wild Bill" Donovan (1883–1959), US Army Major General, commanded the 165th Infantry Regiment (federalized designation of the 69th New York Infantry, the "Fighting Irish") during World War I, and was Chief of the Office of Strategic Services (OSS) during World War II; also awarded the Distinguished Service Cross, Distinguished Service Medal, and National Security Medal, making him the only person to hold all four of the United States' highest awards

E
 Merritt A. Edson (1897–1955), US Marine Corps major general; received for his actions as commanding officer of the 1st Marine Raider Battalion
 Nelson E. Edwards (1887-1954), newsreel cameraman and war photographer, sergeant with the 152nd Depot Brigade at Camp Upton, New York, during World War I (1917-1919) 
 Alan Louis Eggers (1895–1968), World War I
 Henry T. Elrod (1905–1941), US Marine Corps aviator; received for his heroism in the defense of Wake Island during World War II

F
 Frank J. Fletcher (1885–1973), US Navy Admiral, World War II; operational commander at Coral Sea and Midway
 Bruno Albert Forsterer (1869–1957), US Marine Corps sergeant; received for his actions during the Philippine–American War
 Joseph J. Foss (1915–2003), World War II US Marine Corps fighter ace and governor of South Dakota
 Wesley L. Fox (1931–2017), colonel; received for his actions during the Vietnam War

G
 James A. Graham (1940–1967), US Marine Corps Officer; received for his actions during the Vietnam War

H
 Walter Newell Hill (1881–1955), US Marine Corps Officer; received for his actions during United States occupation of Veracruz
 Robert L. Howard (1939–2009), US Army Special Forces
 Thomas J. Hudner Jr. (1924–2017), US Naval Aviator; received for his actions in trying to save the life of his wingman, Ensign Jesse L. Brown, during the Battle of Chosin Reservoir in the Korean War
 John Arthur Hughes (1880–1942), US Marine Corps Officer; received for his actions during the United States occupation of Veracruz
 Henry L. Hulbert (1867–1918), US Marine Corps Sergeant Major; received for his actions during the Second Samoan Civil War

I
 Louis van Iersel (1893–1987), US Army Sergeant, for action during World War I at Mouzon, France
 Jonas H. Ingram (1886–1952), US Navy Admiral, for action in the 1914 Battle of Veracruz
 Edouard Victor Michel Izac (1891–1990), for action during World War I as a US Navy Lieutenant

J
 Douglas T. Jacobson (1925–2000), US Marine Corps Officer; received for his actions on Iwo Jima during World War II
 James E. Johnson (1926–1950) cenotaph, US Marine Corps Sergeant; received for his actions during the Battle of Chosin Reservoir; his body was never recovered
 Julius Stahel (1825–1912), Hungarian born Union general during the Civil War; received for his actions during the Battle of Piedmont

K
 Thomas R. Kerr (1843–1926), Civil War

L
 John H. Leims (1921–1985), US Marine Corps Officer; received for his actions during the Battle of Iwo Jima during World War II

M
 Clarence Mathias (1876–1935), US Marine Corps Sergeant Major; received for his actions during the Boxer Rebellion
 Frederick W. Mausert III (1930–1951), US Marine Corps Sergeant; received for his actions in the Battle of the Punchbowl during the Korean War
 Joseph J. McCarthy (1911–1996), US Marine Corps Officer; received for his actions during the Battle of Iwo Jima during World War II
 Walter C. Monegan Jr. (1930–1950), US Marine Corps Officer; received for his actions during the Korean War
 Audie Murphy (1925–1971), US Army, America's most decorated combat soldier of World War II and popular movie actor
 Reginald R. Myers (1919–2005), US Marine Corps officer; received for his actions during the Korean War.

N
 Wendell Cushing Neville (1870–1930), 14th Commandant of the Marine Corps; received for actions during the United States occupation of Veracruz
 Michael J. Novosel (1922–2006), US Army Chief Warrant Officer 4, known as Dean of the Dustoff Pilots for his two tours in the Vietnam War during which he flew 2,534 missions and airlifted nearly 5,600 medical evacuees

O
 Edward Albert Ostermann (1882–1969), US Marine Corps major general; received for his actions during the United States occupation of Haiti

P
 Mason Patrick (1863–1942) Major General, US Army; Chief of US Air Service; Chief of US Air Corps
 Everett P. Pope (1919–2009), US Marine Corps Officer; received for his actions during the Battle of Peleliu in World War II
 David Dixon Porter (1877–1944), US Marine Corps Major General; received for his actions during the Philippine–American War
 John H. Pruitt (1896–1918), US Marine Corps Corporal; awarded two Medals of Honor for same act during the Battle of Blanc Mont Ridge during World War I

Q
 Peter H. Quinn (1873–1934), for action as a US Army Private in the Philippine–American War

R
 Robert D. Reem (1925–1950), US Marine Corps Officer; received for his actions during the Korean War
 George Croghan Reid (1876–1961), US Marine Corps Brigadier General; received for his actions during the United States occupation of Veracruz
 Robert G. Robinson (1896–1974), US Marine Corps Officer; received for his actions, as a Gunnery Sergeant, during World War I

S
 Christian F. Schilt (1895–1987), US Marine Corps aviator, for using his actions during the United States occupation of Nicaragua
 John Schofield (1831–1906), commanding officer of the second Army of the Ohio during 1864 and 1865; Secretary of War under President Andrew Johnson; superintendent of the United States Military Academy 1876–1881; commanding general of the US Army 1888–1895; received for his actions at the Battle of Wilson's Creek in 1861
 David M. Shoup (1904–1983), 22nd Commandant of the Marine Corps; received for his actions during the Battle of Tarawa during World War II
 Ronald J. Shurer (1978–2020), US Army Special Forces Medical Sergeant; received for his actions in the Battle of Shok Valley during the War in Afghanistan.
 Daniel Sickles (1819–1914), major general, III Corps, Army of the Potomac, Union Army, Civil War; served as US Minister to Spain and as US Representative from New York
 Franklin E. Sigler (1924–1995), US Marine Corps private first class; received for his actions in the Battle of Iwo Jima during World War II
 Carl L. Sitter (1922–2000), US Marine Corps officer; received for his actions during the Korean War
 Luther Skaggs Jr. (1923–1976), US Marine Corps corporal; received for his actions in the Battle of Guam during World War II
 Sherrod E. Skinner Jr. (1929–1952), US Marine Corps officer; received for his actions during the Korean War
 Larry E. Smedley (1949–1967), US Marine Corps corporal; received for his actions during the Vietnam War
 John Lucian Smith (1914–1972), US Marine Corps aviator; received for his actions as a squadron commanding officer during Solomon Islands campaign in World War II
 Paul Ray Smith (1969–2003), US Army Sergeant First Class; received for his actions during the 2003 invasion of Iraq.
 Clarence E. Sutton (1871–1916), US Marine Corps sergeant; received for his actions during the Boxer Rebellion

T
 Clyde A. Thomason (1914–1942), US Marine who posthumously received the Medal of Honor for leading an assault in the Makin Islands
 William George Thordsen (1879–1932), US Navy Coxswain; received for his actions in the Philippine–American War
 Walter Thorn (1844–1920), Union Army Officer in the Civil War

U

 Micheal E. Urell (1844 - 1910) US Army Soldier; received for action during the American Civil War
 Frank Monroe Upton (1896–1962), US Navy Sailor; received for action during World War I
 Matt Urban (1919–1995), US Army Lieutenant Colonel; received seven Purple Hearts for service in World War II
 Uday Singh Taunque (1982-2003), US Army Soldier; received a Bronze Star and a Purple Heart for his service in Iraq War

V
 Alexander Vandegrift (1887–1973), 18th Commandant of the Marine Corps; received for his actions during the Solomon Islands campaign in World War II

W
 Jonathan Mayhew Wainwright IV (1883–1953), US Army General, hero of Bataan and Corregidor, highest-ranking US prisoner of war in World War II
 Kenneth A. Walsh (1916–1998), US Marine Corps Aviator; received for his actions during the Solomon Islands campaign in World War II
 William G. Walsh (1922–1945), US Marine Corps Gunnery Sergeant; received for his actions during the Battle of Iwo Jima in World War II
 Louis H. Wilson Jr. (1920–2005), 26th Commandant of the Marine Corps; received for his actions during the Battle of Guam in World War II
 William G. Windrich (1921–1950), US Marine Corps Staff Sergeant; received for his actions in the Battle of Chosin Reservoir during the Korean War

Y
 Frank Albert Young (1876–1941), US Marine Corps Private; received for his actions during the China Relief Expedition
 Gerald Orren Young (1930–1990), US Air Force Lieutenant Colonel; received for his actions in the Vietnam War

Z
 Jay Zeamer, Jr. (1918–2007), US Air Force Lieutenant Colonel; received for action during World War II with the Army Air Force

Flag officers

A
 Creighton Abrams (1914–1974), US Army General who commanded US military operations in the Vietnam War 1968–1972
 Henry Harley "Hap" Arnold (1886–1950), first (and so far only) General of the Air Force
 Alexander Asboth (1811–1868), Hungarian leader, later Union general during the Civil War

B
 David E. Baker (1946–2009), US Air Force Brigadier General; holds distinction of being the only former prisoner of war of the Vietnam War to later fly combat missions during Operation Desert Storm
 Warner B. Bayley (1845–1928), US Navy Rear Admiral
 Gordon Beecher (1904–1973), US Navy Vice Admiral and composer
 Reginald R. Belknap (1871–1959), US Navy Rear Admiral
 Charles F. Blair, Jr. (1909–1978), US Air Force Brigadier General; buried with wife Maureen O'Hara
 Vicente T. Blaz (1928–2014), US Marine Corps Brigadier General and Delegate to Congress from Guam
 Claude C. Bloch (1878–1967), US Navy Admiral
 Jeremy Michael Boorda (1939–1996), US Navy Admiral and Chief of Naval Operations
 Donald Prentice Booth (1902–1993), US Army lieutenant general, high commissioner of the Ryukyu Islands 1958–1961
 Omar Nelson Bradley (1893–1981), commanded the 12th Army Group in Europe during World War II, first Chairman of the Joint Chiefs of Staff and last living five-star General
 Miles Browning (1897–1954), rear admiral, World War I and World War II Navy Officer and hero of the Battle of Midway
 Omar Bundy (1861–1940), World War I major general who commanded the 1st Brigade, 1st Expeditionary Division in France, awarded the French Legion of Honor and the Croix de Guerre
 Edward Burke (1907–1967), US Navy rear admiral and World War II officer, Navy Cross recipient

C
 John Allen Campbell (1835–1880), brevet brigadier general; Civil War, first governor of Wyoming Territory in 1869 and Third Assistant Secretary of State
 Marion E. Carl (1915–1998), World War II US Marine Corps major general, fighter ace and record-setting test pilot
 Claire Lee Chennault (1893–1958), lieutenant general, military aviator who commanded the "Flying Tigers" during World War II
 John Clem (1851–1937), major general, aka Johnny Shiloh, arguably the youngest Non-Commissioned Officer ever to serve in the US Armed Forces; was the last living Civil War veteran on active duty at the time of his retirement
 John M. B. Clitz (1821–1897), US Navy Rear Admiral
 Edmund R. Colhoun (1821–1897), US Navy Rear Admiral
 Charles M. "Savvy" Cooke, Jr. (1886–1970), US Navy Admiral
 Charles Austin Coolidge (1844–1926), brigadier general, served in Civil War, Indian Wars, Spanish–American War, Philippine–American War and the China Relief Expedition
 Ernest T. Cragg (1922–2006), US Air Force Major General
 George Crook (1828–1890), US Army Major General during the Civil War and campaigns against the Native Americans; one of his subordinates during the Civil War was future President Rutherford B. Hayes

D
 Arthur C. Davis (1893–1965), US Navy Admiral, pioneer of dive bombing
 Benjamin O. Davis, Sr. (1880–1970), United States Army General; first African-American General Officer in the US Army and in the US military
 Benjamin O. Davis, Jr. (1912–2002), World War II pilot, first African-American US Air Force General
 Jeremiah Andrew Denton, Jr. (1924–2014), US Navy pilot shot down over Vietnam and held as a POW for over seven years; achieve the rank of admiral before retiring from the Navy; served in the US Senate from Alabama
 Sir John Dill (1881–1944), British diplomat and Field Marshal
 Abner Doubleday (1819–1893), Civil War General, erroneously credited with inventing baseball
 Franklin J. Drake (1846–1929), US Navy Rear Admiral

E
 Clarence Ransom Edwards (1860–1931), US Army Major General, commanded the 26th "Yankee" Division in World War I

F
 Nathan Bedford Forrest III (1905–1943), brigadier general of the US Army Air Forces, and a great-grandson of Confederate General Nathan Bedford Forrest; first American general killed in action during World War II

G
 Francis L. Garrett (1919–1992), US Navy Rear Admiral, Chief of Chaplains of the US Navy
 John Gibbon (1827–1896), brigadier general, Union Army, Civil War, most notably commander of 2nd Division, US II Corps that repelled Pickett's Charge at the Battle of Gettysburg
 William A. Glassford (1886–1958), US Navy Vice Admiral
 Harold J. Greene (1959-2014), US Army Major General
 Charles D. Griffin (1906–1996), US Navy Admiral

H
 William "Bull" Halsey (1882–1959), World War II Navy Fleet Admiral
 John Spencer Hardy (1913–2012), Chief of Operations in the Mediterranean of US Army Air Corps during World War II; later lieutenant general in US Air Force
 William Babcock Hazen (1830–1887), major general, served in the Western Union Armies during the Civil War. Served as Chief Signal Officer after the war
 Francis J. Higginson (1843–1931), US Navy rear admiral
 Jeanne M. Holm (1921–2010), US Air Force major general; first woman promoted to brigadier general in the Air Force; first woman promoted to major general in the US armed forces
 Grace Hopper (1906–1992), US Navy rear admiral, pioneering computer scientist who coined the term "bug"
 Olaf M. Hustvedt (1886–1978), US Navy Vice Admiral

I
 John Irwin (1832–1901), US Navy Rear Admiral

J
 Daniel "Chappie" James, Jr. (1920–1978), US Air Force; first African American four-star general in the US armed forces
 David C. Jones (1921–2013), US Air Force, ninth Chairman of the Joint Chiefs of Staff

K
 Włodzimierz Krzyżanowski (1824–1887), Polish military leader and Union General in the American Civil War
 Philip Kearny (1815–1862), US Army Major General in the Mexican–American War and American Civil War

L
 Rae Landy (1885–1952), Army Nurse Corps Lieutenant Colonel who served in World War I and World War II
 Henry Louis Larsen (1890–1962), US Marine Corps Lieutenant General; commanded the first deployed American troops in both World Wars; Governor of Guam and American Samoa
 John Marshall Lee (1914–2003), US Navy Vice Admiral, World War II, Korea, Vietnam, NATO, S.A.L.T Talks; Navy Cross, DSM, Legion of Merit; son of Lieutenant Colonel Alva Lee

M
 Arthur MacArthur Jr. (1845–1912), US Army Lieutenant General and father of General Douglas MacArthur
 Newton E. Mason (1850–1945), US Navy Rear Admiral
 Henry Pinckney McCain (1861–1941), US Army Major General and Adjutant General of the US Army; Uncle to John McCain Sr, Grand-Uncle of John McCain Jr.
 John S. McCain, Jr. (1911–1981), US Navy admiral and father of Senator John McCain
 John S. McCain, Sr. (1884–1945), US Navy admiral, grandfather of Senator John McCain, and father of Admiral John S. McCain, Jr.
 William Alexander McCain (1878–1960), US Army brigadier general, brother of John McCain Sr., uncle of John McCain Jr.
 Bowman H. McCalla (1844–1910), US Navy Rear Admiral
 Stewart L. McKenney (1917–2012), brigadier general, mayor of American Vienna Occupation
 Montgomery C. Meigs (1816–1892), brigadier general; Arlington National Cemetery was established by Meigs, who commanded the garrison at Arlington House and appropriated the grounds on June 15, 1864, for use as a military cemetery
 Nelson A. Miles (1839–1925), US Army lieutenant general; served in the Civil War, Indian Wars, and the Spanish–American War; noted for accepting the surrender of Geronimo and his band of Apache
 Joseph Mower (1827–1870), major general, served in the western Union Armies during the Civil War

N
 Reginald F. Nicholson (1852–1939), US Navy rear admiral; last US Navy officer on active duty to have seen service during the Civil War; first US naval attaché to Ecuador and Peru

O
 Raymond T. Odierno (1954–2021), general, 38th Chief of Staff, United States Army, 2011-2015
 Edward Ord (1818–1883), major general, Army of the James during the Appomattox Campaign, Union Army, Civil War

P
 George S. Patton IV (1923–2004), US Army major general and son of famed World War II general George S. Patton
 Raymond Stanton Patton (1882–1937), rear admiral and first flag officer of the United States Coast and Geodetic Survey Corps and second Director of the United States Coast and Geodetic Survey (1929–1937)
 John J. Pershing (1860–1948), commander of the American Expeditionary Forces in World War I and America's first General of the Armies
 David Dixon Porter (1813–1891), admiral, Union Navy, Civil War, most notable as the Union naval commander during the Vicksburg Campaign, a turning point of the war which split the Confederacy in two

R
 John Aaron Rawlins (1831–1869), Civil War general, chief of staff and later Secretary of War to Ulysses S. Grant
 Alfred C. Richmond (1902–1984), admiral, 11th Commandant of the Coast Guard
 Hyman G. Rickover (1900–1986), admiral, father of the Nuclear Navy
 Matthew Ridgway (1895–1993), World War II and Korean War general, Chief of Staff of the Army
 William S. Rosecrans (1819–1898), major general, Army of the Cumberland, Union Army, Civil War
 William T. Ryder (1913–1992), brigadier general; first American paratrooper

S
 Thomas R. Sargent III (1914–2010), vice admiral, Vice Commandant of the Coast Guard
 August Schomburg (1908–1972), lieutenant general, Commander US Army Ordnance and Missile Command; commander, Industrial College of the Armed Forces
 Gustavus H. Scott (1812–1882), US Navy rear admiral, exhumed in 1896 from Oak Hill Cemetery in Washington, D.C., and reburied at Arlington National Cemetery
 Benedict J. Semmes, Jr. (1913–1994), US Navy vice admiral
 John Shalikashvili (1936–2011), general, Supreme Allied Commander Europe (1992–1993), Chairman of the Joint Chiefs of Staff (1993–1997)
 Philip Sheridan (1831–1888), general, Union Army, Civil War and commanding general, US Army, 1883–88
 Robert F. Sink (1905–1965), US Army lieutenant general and former regimental commander of the 506th Parachute Infantry Regiment, 101st Airborne Division; a close friend of Easy Company commander Major Richard Winters, he is portrayed by Vietnam veteran and retired US Marine Corps captain Dale Dye in the HBO/BBC miniseries Band of Brothers
 Joseph S. Skerrett (1833–1897), US Navy rear admiral
 Walter Bedell Smith (1895–1961), general, US Army, World War II, Dwight D. Eisenhower's Chief of Staff during Eisenhower's tenure at SHAEF and Director of the CIA 1950–1953; served as US Ambassador to the Soviet Union 1946–1948
 Harold I. Small (1932–2015), US Army Major General, Commanding General US Army Transportation Command, 1980–1985, Commanding General Fort Eustis, 1978–1985, Korean War, Vietnam War.
 Charles Stillman Sperry (1847–1911), US Navy rear admiral, commander of the Great White Fleet, namesake of 
 Robert Francis Anthony Studds (1896–1962), United States Coast and Geodetic Survey Corps admiral and engineer, fourth Director of the United States Coast and Geodetic Survey

T
 Robert A. "Fuzzy" Theobald (1884–1957), US Navy rear admiral who commanded Navy forces in the Aleutian Islands Campaign during World War II

V
 Howard L. Vickery (1892–1946), vice admiral, US Navy and World War II merchant shipbuilder

W
 Donald M. Weller (1908–1985), major general, pioneer of Naval gunfire support; served during World War II
 Joseph Wheeler (1836–1906), served as a major general of the Confederate Army during the Civil War, and the US Army during the Spanish–American War and Philippine–American War
 Orde Charles Wingate (1903–1944), British major general, creator and commander of the Chindits
 Spencer S. Wood (1861–1940), US Navy rear admiral
 Clark H. Woodward (1877–1968), vice admiral, served in five wars: the Spanish–American War, Philippine–American War, Boxer Rebellion and both World Wars
 Horatio Wright (1820–1899), major general; commanded VI Corps of the Army of the Potomac from the Overland Campaign to the end of the Civil War; then served as the Chief of Engineers for the US Army Corps of Engineers; worked on projects such as the Brooklyn Bridge and the completion of the Washington Monument

Other military burials

A
 Quentin C. Aanenson (1921–2008), World War II veteran fighter pilot and former captain of the 391st Fighter Squadron, 366th Fighter Group, 9th Air Force, US Army Air Corps
 George Adamski (1891–1965), noted ufologist
 Olavi Alakulppi (1915–1990), Finnish cross country skier and recipient of the Mannerheim Cross who rose to the rank of lieutenant colonel in the US Army
 John B. Anderson (1922–2017), World War II staff sergeant and politician

B

 Alan Bean (1932–2018), astronaut, fourth person to walk on the Moon (Apollo 12)
 Van D. Bell Jr. (1918–2009), US Marine Corps colonel, recipient of two Navy Crosses
 Albert Blithe (1923–1967), US Army paratrooper; one of several Easy Company soldiers depicted in Band of Brothers.
 Ruby G. Bradley (1907–2002), colonel; with 34 medals, one of the most decorated women in US military history
 Alfred Winsor Brown (1885–1938), US Navy Captain who served as 31st Naval Governor of Guam
 Frank Buckles (1901–2011), last known American veteran of World War I
 Charles Burlingame (1949–2001), US Navy Captain, pilot of hijacked American Airlines Flight 77 during September 11 attacks

C
 Roger Chaffee (1935–1967), astronaut killed in the Apollo 1 fire
 Samuel-Edmour St. Onge Chapleau (1839–1921), US Army major in the Civil War; Clerk of the Senate of Canada and Clerk of the Parliaments of Canada, 1900–1917
 Willis Carto (1926–2015), American political activist
 William Christman (1843–1864), first soldier buried at Arlington
 Bertram Tracy Clayton (1862–1918), Congressman from New York, killed in action in 1918
 William Colby (1920–1996) Member of the Office of Strategic Services, Director of Central Intelligence.
 Michael Collins (astronaut) (1930-2021), US Air Force officer, NASA Astronaut; Command Module Pilot for Apollo 11.
 Truman W. Crawford (1934–2003), US Marine Corps colonel (1966–1996); commander of the United States Marine Drum and Bugle Corps; oldest active duty Marine at the time of his retirement; formerly US Air Force master sergeant (1953–1963); musical director of the US Air Force Drum and Bugle Corps
 William P. Cronan (1879–1929), US Navy officer and 19th Naval Governor of Guam
 Scott Crossfield (1921–2006), US Naval aviator and test pilot; first to fly at twice the speed of sound; played a major role in the design and development of the North American X-15

D
 John Charles Daly (1914–1991), radio and TV newsman and television host on What's My Line?
 Jane Delano (1862–1919), Director of Army Nursing Corps
 Dieter Dengler (1938–2001), US Navy pilot shot down over Laos who escaped from a Pathet Lao POW camp; subject of the film Rescue Dawn

E
 John Joy Edson (1846–1935), Civil War; executive and treasurer of National Geographic Society
 Aleksander Einseln (1931–2017) United States Army colonel who later became general and commander-in-chief of the Estonian Defence Forces

G
 Rene Gagnon (1925–1979), one of the six US Marines immortalized in Joe Rosenthal's iconic photo Raising the Flag on Iwo Jima
 John Glenn (1921–2016), first American to orbit the Earth; US Senator; fighter pilot in World War II and Korea
 Gus Grissom (1926–1967), astronaut killed in the Apollo 1 fire
 Jerry Don Glover (1936-2020), 20-year Air-Force military career, he was a Navigator in Vietnam and retired as a Lt. Colonel with honors and a Purple Heart

H
 David Haskell Hackworth (1930–2005), colonel and highly decorated soldier
 Ira Hayes (1923–1955), one of the six US marines immortalized in Joe Rosenthal's iconic photo Raising the Flag on Iwo Jima
 Nicholas H. Heck (1882–1953), US Coast and Geodetic Survey captain, geophysicist, seismologist, oceanographer, and hydrographic surveyor
 Anton Hilberath (1898–1946), one of at least 830 German Prisoners of War, who died and were buried in the United States. His is the only grave of a German POW at Arlington National Cemetery.
 Kara Spears Hultgreen (1965–1994), the first female naval carrier-based fighter pilot
Alexander Hunter (1843-1914), Confederate private and author of the Civil War memoir Johnny Reb & Billy Yank

J
 Benjamin R. Jacobs (1879–1963), served as a US Army captain in both World War I and World War II, with his wife, Margaret Ann Connell Jacobs (1890–1973)
 James Jabara (1923–1966), first American jet ace in history, credited with shooting down 15 enemy aircraft
 George Juskalian (1914–2010), US Army veteran, three decades and fought in three wars – World War II, Korean War, and Vietnam War

K
 Mildred Kelly (1928–2003), US Army command sergeant major; first African American woman to serve as an Army sergeant major
 Jack Koehler (1930–2012), US Army veteran, Associated Press executive and former White House Communications Director
 Humayun Khan (soldier) (1976-2004), Iraq War
 Kareem Rashad Sultan Khan (1987-2007) Iraq War

L
 Walter Francis Layer (1907–1965), US Marine Corps Officer; Legion of Merit award recipient, member of the Naval Order of the United States
 Felix Z. Longoria Jr. (1920–1945), Mexican American soldier in the US Army; killed in World War II
 Liu Nia-chien, Major in the Chinese Military, died October 19, 1946
 Ruth A. Lucas (1920–2013), the first African American female Air Force Colonel
 Francis Lupo (1895–1918), private killed in France during World War I; holds the distinction of possibly being the longest US service member missing in action to be found (1918–2003)

M
 Mark Matthews (1894–2005), last surviving Buffalo Soldier
 Anna Maxwell (1851–1929), the American Florence Nightingale; was buried due to her contributions to the Army Nurse Corps
 David McCampbell (1910–1996), the US Navy's top World War II fighter ace with 34 kills
 Glenn Miller (1904–1944) cenotaph, Army Air Forces Major and well known band leader who disappeared over the English Channel

O
 Buckey O'Neill (1860–1898), officer in Theodore Roosevelt's Rough Riders who was killed in the Battle of San Juan Hill
 Peter J. Ortiz (1913–1988), US Marine Corps colonel, member of the Office of Strategic Services who fought in Europe during World War II, recipient of two Navy Crosses
 Robert F. Overmyer (1936–1996), test pilot, US Marine Corps colonel, and NASA astronaut
 William Owens (1980–2017), a US Navy SEAL who was killed during the raid on Yakla in January 2017; the first combatant to die during the presidency of Donald Trump

P
 Francis Gary Powers (1929–1977), U-2 pilot shot down over the Soviet Union in 1960
 Colin Powell (1937–2021)

S
 Thomas Selfridge (1882–1908), first lieutenant in the US Army and the first person to die in a crash of a powered airplane.
 Robert Stethem (1961–1985), United States Navy Seabee diver murdered by Hezbollah terrorists during the hijacking of TWA Flight 847.  is named in his honor.   
 Michael Strank (1919–1945), one of the six US marines immortalized in Joe Rosenthal's iconic photo Raising the Flag on Iwo Jima; killed in action just days after the photo was taken.
 Leroy Suddath (1931–2020), major general

T
 William Cooper Talley (1831–1901), brevet brigadier general for the Union Army during the U.S. Civil War
 Larry Thorne (born as Lauri Törni, 1919–1965), Finnish soldier who served in the US special forces and was a World War II veteran; called "soldier who fought under three flags" (Finland, Germany, and US); also, the only former member of the Waffen SS to be interred in Arlington

V
 Blake Wayne Van Leer (1926–1997), Commander and Captain in the U.S. Navy. Lead SeaBee program and lead the nuclear research and power unit at McMurdo Station during Operation Deep Freeze.

W
 Joshua Wheeler (1975–2015), US Army Delta Force operator. Silver Star recipient. The first American to be killed fighting ISIS insurgents and the first American to be killed in Iraq since November 2011.

Y
 Charles Young (1864–1922), first African-American colonel in the US Army
 John Young (1930–2018), NASA astronaut and ninth man to walk on the moon (Apollo 16).

Other notable military service members

A
 Peter H. Allabach (1824–1892), colonel in the Union Army during the Civil War, Chief of the United States Capitol Police

B
 William B. Bader, Assistant Secretary of State for Educational and Cultural Affairs
 Joseph J. Bartlett (1834–1893), Union Brigadier General during the Civil War, New York attorney, and U.S. diplomat
 Sosthenes Behn (1882–1957), businessman and founder of ITT Corporation
 William W. Belknap, Army general, secretary of war
 Ludwig Bemelmans, author of the Madeline children's series.
 Hugo Black, Associate Justice of the Supreme Court of the United States
 William J. Brennan, Jr., Associate Justice of the Supreme Court of the United States
 Al Brodax, animator
 Ron Brown, Secretary of Commerce
 William Jennings Bryan, Secretary of State, three-time presidential candidate, orator
 William Francis Buckley, CIA station chief, murdered in Beirut

C
 Frank Carlucci (1930–2018), Secretary of Defense
 Jacob Chestnut (1940–1998), United States Capitol Police officer killed in the 1998 Capitol shooting attack
 Purnell W. Choppin (1929–2021), virologist and physician
 Clark Clifford (1906–1998), Secretary of Defense, advisor to four presidents
 Winifred Collins (1911–1999), a World War II WAVES
 Charles "Pete" Conrad, Jr. (1930–1999), Apollo astronaut, third man to walk on the Moon
 Jackie Cooper (1922–2011), actor, television director, producer and executive
 James C. Corman (1920–2000), California politician

D
 Dwight F. Davis, Secretary of War; established the Davis Cup
 Michael E. DeBakey, famous cardiovascular physician; US Army soldier during World War II
 John Dingell, World War II veteran and politician
 Bob Dole (1923-2021), served in World War II as a second lieutenant in the US Army's 10th Mountain Division, was seriously wounded by a German shell that struck his upper back and right arm while engaging in combat near Castel d'Aiano in the Apennine mountains southwest of Bologna, Italy. Later became a member of Kansas state House of Representatives, County Attorney of Russell County, Kansas, represented his home state of Kansas as a member of US House of Representatives and as a US Senator, and was the Republican nominee in the 1996 United States Presidential election. Awarded Bronze Star and Purple Heart.
 John Foster Dulles, secretary of state
 Charles Durning, Army veteran and actor

E

 R. Lee Ermey (1944–2018), USMC staff sergeant and actor
 Medgar Evers (1925–1963), NAACP field secretary in Mississippi during the Civil Rights Movement; assassinated in 1963

F
 Arthur A. Fletcher, civil rights advocate
 Lawrence Freedman, former US Army Special operations soldier with Delta Force; CIA paramilitary operative killed in Somalia in 1992
 William F. Friedman, US Army cryptologist who co-created the field of American cryptanalysis with his wife Elizebeth Friedman, and broke many ciphers, including the Japanese Code Purple in World War II

G
 Alex Gard (1898–1948), US Navy sailor; famous New York City restaurant and theatrical cartoonist of Russian descent
 Richard F. Gordon Jr. (1929–2017), astronaut
 Stanley L. Greigg, US Congressman from Iowa

H
 Peter Hackes, Navy Captain and correspondent
 Alexander Haig, secretary of state, 1981–82
 Robert Halperin, competitive Star-class sailor, and Olympic bronze medalist and Pan American Games gold medalist
 Dashiell Hammett, author
 Oliver Wendell Holmes, Jr. (1841–1935), Associate Justice of the Supreme Court of the United States, wounded three times in the Civil War, "The Great Dissenter"
 Kara Spears Hultgreen (1965–1994), US Navy officer and naval aviator; first American woman fighter pilot in the US Navy; first female fighter pilot killed after the Department of Defense Risk Rule

I
 Robert G. Ingersoll, political leader and orator, noted for his agnosticism

J
 René Joyeuse (1920–2012), free French Officer (Captain) who served in the Office of Strategic Services (OSS) during World War II and was awarded the Distinguished Service Cross; physician; co-founder of the American Trauma Society
Henry S. Julian (1862–1939), member of the Missouri House of Representatives and military officer during the Spanish–American War

K

 Kenneth Keating (1900–1975), brigadier general, US Senator from New York (1959–1965)
 Edward Stanley Kellogg (1870–1948), US Navy Captain, 16th Governor of American Samoa (1923–1925)
 Burt Kennedy (1922–2001), US Army Lieutenant during World War II, film director and screenwriter
 Edward M. Kennedy (1932–2009), US Army veteran (1951–1953), US Senator from Massachusetts (1962–2009)
 John F. Kennedy (1917–1963), US Navy officer during World War II, US Representative (1947–1953) and US Senator (1953–1961) from Massachusetts, President of the United States (1961–1963)
 Robert F. Kennedy (1925–1968), Attorney General of the United States (1961–1964), US Senator from New York (1965–1968)
 Kareem Rashad Sultan Khan (1987–2007), Iraq War
 Humayun Khan, US Army captain
 Frank Kowalski, US Army veteran of World War II; US Representative from Connecticut

L
 Frank Lautenberg, World War II veteran and US Senator from New Jersey
 Paul Laxalt, World War II medic and US Governor from Nevada
 Pierre Charles L'Enfant, French military engineer, architect, and urban planner; designed the city of Washington
 Henry Balding Lewis, US Army major general, Veterans Administration
 Robert Todd Lincoln, Secretary of War, son of former US President Abraham Lincoln
 Joe Louis, world heavyweight boxing champion
 Allard Lowenstein, US Congressman from New York
 Richard Lugar, Senator from Indiana
 John R. Lynch, freedman, US Army major, and member of Congress

M
 Arthur MacArthur III (1876–1923), US Navy captain, brother of General Douglas MacArthur
 Crandal Mackey (1865–1957), Lawyer and commonwealth attorney of Arlington, Virginia
 Mike Mansfield (1903–2001), Navy veteran of World War I, Army private, Marine Corps private; longest-serving Senate Majority Leader; longest-serving Ambassador to Japan
 George C. Marshall, Chief of Staff of the Army, General of the Army, Emissary to China, Secretary of State, and Secretary of Defense; instrumental in developing the European Recovery Program (Marshall Plan) after World War II
 Richard Jaquelin Marshall (1895–1973), Major General US  Army; brother to St. Julien Ravenel Marshall and cousin to George C. Marshall
 St. Julien Ravenel Marshall (1904–1989), Brigadier General USMC brother to Richard Jaquelin Marshall and cousin to George C. Marshall
 Lee Marvin (1924–1987), Marine Corps veteran and actor. Purple Heart, Presidential Unit Citation, American Campaign Medal, Asiatic Pacific Campaign Medal, World War II Victory Medal, and Combat Action Ribbon. 56 motion picture acting appearances resulting in 18 Award nominations with 11 awards. 212 Television credits resulting in 1 Emmy nomination. Father of 4.
 Bill Mauldin, editorial cartoonist; noted for World War II-era work satirizing military life in Stars and Stripes
 George B. McClellan, Jr. (1865–1940), Mayor of New York (1904–1909), son of Union Army major general George B. McClellan
 Ruth Colvin Starrett McGuire (1893–1950), plant pathologist
 John C. Metzler, World War II sergeant, former superintendent of Arlington National Cemetery (1951–1972); his son John C. Metzler, Jr. was also the superintendent 1991–2010
 Daniel Patrick Moynihan, US Senator from New York

P
 Phelps Phelps, 38th Governor of American Samoa and United States Ambassador to the Dominican Republic
 Spot Poles, considered among the greatest outfielders of the Negro leagues
 Lewis Burwell Puller, Jr. (1945–1994), attorney, Pulitzer Prize winning author and former officer in the US Marine Corps

Q
 Manuel Quezon (1878–1944), former 2nd president of the Philippines
Philippines President of the Commonwealth of the Philippines (1935–1944); served in the Philippine Revolutionary Army; transferred in 1946 to the Manila North Cemetery and subsequently transferred to the Quezon Memorial Shrine in 1979.

R
 John Raymond Rice, US Army Sergeant First Class (Korean Conflict), who was denied a burial in Sioux City, Iowa because of him being Native American (Ho-Chunk)
 William Rehnquist, US Army Air Forces Sergeant (World War II), Chief Justice of the United States
 Charles Herschel "Charlie" Reiner (1918-2001), brother to famous comedian and producer Carl Reiner, served in the 9th Division in World War II.
 Earl W. Renfroe, US Army Colonel (World War II), orthodontist who helped originate the concept of preventive and interceptive orthodontics
 Frank Reynolds, US Army Staff Sergeant (World War II), ABC television anchorman
 Bradbury Robinson, US Army Captain (World War I); threw the first forward pass in American football history; physician; nutritionist; conservationist; and local politician
 Lewis C. Rockwell, US Army aviator killed in a flying accident in 1912
 William P. Rogers, US Navy Lieutenant Commander (World War II); politician; Secretary of State
 Malcolm Ross, US Navy Captain (World War II), an atmospheric scientist and balloonist who set several records for altitude and scientific inquiry. In 1960, set the altitude record for manned balloon flight.

S
 Brian Sicknick (1978–2021), United States Capitol Police officer killed in the 2021 storming of the United States Capitol.
 Samuel W. Small, journalist, evangelist, prohibitionist
 Helmut Sonnenfeldt (1926–2012), foreign policy expert for Henry Kissinger
 Johnny Micheal Spann, CIA officer and former US Marine Corps captain; first American killed in Afghanistan
 Cordwainer Smith (1913-1966), Army officer involved in the creation of the Office of War Information and the Operation Planning and Intelligence Board, science fiction author
 John Paul Stevens (1920–2019), Navy intelligence officer in the Pacific Theater, Lieutenant commander, Associate Justice of the Supreme Court of the United States
 Ted Stevens (1923–2010), US Senator from Alaska
 Potter Stewart, World War II sailor and Associate Justice of the Supreme Court of the United States
 Cecil W. Stoughton (1920–2008), White House photographer for President Kennedy
 Samuel S. Stratton, 15-term US Representative from New York
 Anthony Sydes (1941–2015), actor

T
 William Howard Taft, Secretary of War, President of the United States, and Chief Justice of the United States
 John Tyler Jr. (1819–1896), son of President John Tyler; served as Private Secretary to his father, Confederate Assistant Secretary of War

W

 Earl Warren, Chief Justice of the United States
 John W. Weeks, Secretary of War, US Senator and US Representative
 Joseph F. Weis Jr., World War II veteran and federal judge
 George Westinghouse, Civil War veteran, Westinghouse Electric founder
 Harvey W. Wiley, first Commissioner of the Food and Drug Administration; "father" of the Pure Food and Drug Act
 Charles Willeford, World War II veteran and author
 George M. Williamson, architect
 Charles Wilson, Texas congressman who aided in the success of Operation Cyclone during the Soviet–Afghan War
 Theodore Jonathan Wint, Brigadier General, Veteran of the Civil War, Indian Wars, Boxer Rebellion, and Spanish American War.

Y
 Sid Yudain, journalist and founder of Roll Call

Notable civilians

B
 Fay Bainter, Oscar-winning Hollywood film actress. Buried with her husband, U.S. Navy officer Reginald Venable.
 Gretta Bader, sculptor, buried with her husband, William B. Bader
 Constance Bennett, Hollywood film actress, buried with her husband, Brigadier General Theron John Coulter
Charles W. Berry (1871–1941), New York City Comptroller; also a soldier
 Harry Blackmun, Associate Justice of the Supreme Court of the United States
 William Jennings Bryan, politician and lawyer
 Warren E. Burger, Chief Justice of the United States

C
 Leslie Coffelt, White House police officer killed fighting off would-be assassins of President Harry S. Truman in the 1950 assassination attempt at Blair House
 George Washington Parke Custis, founder of Arlington Plantation; grandson of Martha Washington; step-grandson and adopted son of President George Washington; father to Mary Anna Custis Lee
 Mary Lee Fitzhugh Custis, wife to George Washington Parke Custis; daughter of William Fitzhugh and Ann Bolling Randolph Fitzhugh; mother to Mary Anna Custis Lee

D
 William O. Douglas, Associate Justice of the Supreme Court of the United States

E
 Medgar Evers, American civil rights activist, Mississippi's field secretary for the NAACP, and a World War II veteran who had served in the United States Army

F
 Elizebeth Friedman, noted cryptanalyst who broke thousands of ciphers during the Prohibition Era and World Wars, trained first group of WWI cryptologists. Buried with husband William Friedman.

G
 John Gibson (1956–1998), United States Capitol Police officer killed in the 1998 Capitol shooting attack
 Eunice Renshaw Geiger (1893-1982) - American First Lady of Guam.
 Astronaut John Glenn (1921-2016), the first American astronaut to orbit the Earth and his wife Annie (1920–2020)
 Ruth Bader Ginsburg (1933–2020), Associate Justice of the Supreme Court of the United States and her husband Martin D. (1932-2010), who worked as a law professor

H
 Matthew Henson (1866–1955), first African-American to seek the North Pole
 Juliet Opie Hopkins (1818–1890), "Florence Nightingale of the South"

K
 Arabella Kennedy, (1956) infant daughter of Jacqueline and John F. Kennedy
 Jacqueline Kennedy Onassis (1929–1994), First Lady of the United States (1961–1963), wife of John F. Kennedy
 Patrick Bouvier Kennedy (1963–1963), infant son of Jacqueline and John F. Kennedy
 Phyllis Kirk (1927–2006), TV and film actress; buried alongside her husband, Warren V. Bush (Sgt., US Air Force)

L
 Abraham Lincoln II (1873–1890), only son of Robert Todd Lincoln, grandson of Abraham Lincoln
 Mary Harlan Lincoln (1846–1937), wife of Robert Todd Lincoln, daughter of Senator James Harlan

M
 Thurgood Marshall (1908–1993), Associate Justice of the Supreme Court of the United States
 Roberta McCain (1912–2020), wife of John S. McCain Jr.
 Anita Newcomb McGee (1864–1940), woman doctor, founder of Army Nurse Corps
 Robert McNamara (1916–2009), Secretary of Defense 1961–1968
 Hooper S. Miles (1895–1964), politician and lawyer from Maryland
 Edmund Muskie (1914–1996), politician; Secretary of State 1980–1981
 Jane Muskie (1927–2004), First Lady of Maine

O
 Maureen O'Hara (1920–2015), actress, interred as Maureen FitzSimons Blair alongside her husband, Brigadier General Charles F. Blair, Jr. US Air Force Reserve.

P
 James Parks (1843–1929), freedman, the only person buried at Arlington Cemetery who was born on the grounds

R
 Mary Randolph (1762–1828), first person buried at Arlington Plantation; descendant of Pocahontas and John Rolfe; cousin to Mary Lee Fitzhugh Custis
 Marie Teresa Rios (1917–1999), author of Fifteenth Pelican, basis for The Flying Nun television show

S
 Diana Sowle (1930–2018), actress

T
 Helen Herron Taft (1861–1943), First Lady of the United States (1909–1913), wife of William Howard Taft
 Lydia H. Tilton (1839–1915), lyricist, "Old Glory", the national song of the Daughters of the American Revolution

Other
Remains of the Space Shuttle Challenger's crew are interred in Section 46, including four civilians and three military members. Challenger Astronaut Judith Resnik is memorialized with a cenotaph.

Five state funerals have been held at Arlington: those of U.S. presidents William Howard Taft and John F. Kennedy, that of General of the Armies John J. Pershing, that of U.S. Senator Edward M. Kennedy and his brother Senator Robert F. Kennedy.

References

External links

 ArlingtonCemetery.org – unofficial website (archived page)
 ArlingtonCemetery.org – unofficial website – notable burials (archived page)
 Memorial Day Ceremony at Arlington Cemetery – ArlingtonCemetery.org – unofficial website (archived page)
 National Park Service site
 Interment.net – interment Information
 ArlingtonCemetery.net – unofficial website
 
 
 

 
Arlington
people buried at Arlington National Cemetery
Arlington National Cemetery